The High Sheriff of Donegal was the British Crown's judicial representative in County Donegal in Ulster, Ireland, from the late 16th century until 1922, when the office was abolished in the new Irish Free State and replaced by the office of Donegal County Sheriff. The High Sheriff had judicial, electoral, ceremonial and administrative functions and executed High Court Writs. In 1908, an Order in Council made the Lord-Lieutenant the Sovereign's prime representative in a county and reduced the High Sheriff's precedence. However, the sheriff retained his responsibilities for the preservation of law and order in the county. The usual procedure for appointing the sheriff from 1660 onwards was that three persons were nominated at the beginning of each year from the county and the Lord Lieutenant then appointed his choice as High Sheriff for the remainder of the year. Often the other nominees were appointed as under-sheriffs. Sometimes a sheriff did not fulfil his entire term through death or other event and another sheriff was then appointed for the remainder of the year. The dates given hereunder are the dates of appointment.  All addresses are in County Donegal unless stated otherwise.

County Donegal was created in 1607.

High Sheriffs of County Donegal
1640: Henry Vaughan
1664: Thomas Grove of Castle Shanahan
1669: John Nesbitt
1682: Paul Benson
1686: John Forward
1686: Lancelot Carleton 
1694: Sir Francis Hamilton, 3rd Baronet of Killock in the County of Down.
1697: William Stewart, of Fort Stewart

18th century

19th century

20th century

References

 
Donegal
History of County Donegal